Hulikal is a village located in the Hosanagara taluk of the Shimoga district in the Indian state of Karnataka and is known for its heavy rainfall. The Hulikal village lies in western ghat ( Paschima ghatta in Kannada ) region of Karnataka state. The range of ghat is known by the name Hulikal ghat or Balebare ghat. The road running between Hosangadi and Mastikatte through Hulikal ghati connects coastal district of Udupi with Shivamogga ( Shimoga ) district. The Mani dam reservoir and Savehoklu reservoir are nearby. KPCL has its colony at Mastikatte near to Hulikal. The nearest airport is at Mangalore, situated 123 km south-west of Hulikal. It has an elevation of 600m.

Climate 
Hulikal experiences an extremely wet tropical monsoon climate (Am) under the Köppen climate classification. It has little to no rainfall from December to April and heavy to extremely heavy rainfall from May to November.

Rainfall
It is situated in the dense forests of the Western Ghats. Over the past few years it has surpassed the rainfall record held by Agumbe in Tirthahalli taluk, also in Shimoga district to be arguably called the 'rain capital' of Karnataka.

However, rainfall in Amagaon  near Khanapur in Belgaum District has reached the figure of 10,000 mm annual rainfall twice from 2006 to 2011. Also, Amagaon has received more rain than Agumbe and Hulikal three times from 2006 to 2011.

Comparisons
The table below compares rainfall  between Agumbe in Thirthahalli taluk in Shimoga district, Hulikal in Hosanagara taluk in Shimoga district, Amagaon in Khanapur Taluk in Belgaum district and Talacauvery in Madikeri taluk in Kodagu district, Kerekatte of Sringeri Taluk in Chikmagalur District, Nilkund of Siddapur Taluk in Uttara Kannada district and Kollur of Kundapur Taluk in Udupi district to show which one can be called the "Cherrapunji of South India".

Notes and references

Villages in Shimoga district